KNTO (93.3 FM) is a radio station broadcasting a Spanish-language Oldies format. Licensed to Chowchilla, California, United States, the station is currently owned by Centro Christiano Amistad Church.

History
The station was assigned the call letters KXDA on July 12, 1990. On October 3, 1994, the station changed its call sign to KLVN, on September 19, 1998, to KSKD-FM, and on February 14, 2002, to the current KNTO.

References

External links

NTO
Oldies radio stations in the United States
NTO
Mass media in Merced County, California